Civitacampomarano is a comune (municipality) in the Province of Campobasso in the Italian region Molise, located about  north of Campobasso.

Civitacampomarano borders the following municipalities: Castelbottaccio, Castelmauro, Guardialfiera, Lucito, Lupara, Trivento.

It is the birthplace of soldier and patriot Gabriele Pepe and of politician, patriot and writer Vincenzo Cuoco.

Main sights
Angevine Castle (13th century)
Church of Santa Maria Maggiore (c. 11th century)
Church of Santa Maria delle Grazie, with a late-Gothic portal.
Church of San Giorgio Martire
Birth house of Vincenzo Cuoco
Park of Vallemonterosso
CVtà Street Fest” has been taking place in the village every summer since 2016 with artistic director Alice Pasquini the world renowned street artist.  This festival of street art highlights the work of internationally renowned artists and attracts thousands of visitors to the village. Visually impressive, brightly colored murals are painted onto the walls of old buildings as a way of rediscovering the village’s historical center, fascinating everyone who pauses to admire them. The festival is one of the challenges won by this visionary village: to capture beauty through art and its ability to narrate everlasting stories.

Food of Civitacampomarano:

the village is known for cielli, a cookie filled with a mixture of fruits, or grape must.

References

Cities and towns in Molise